The 2010–11 Croatian Football Cup was the twentieth season of Croatia's football knockout competition.

The defending champions were Hajduk Split, having won their fifth title the previous year by defeating Šibenik in the final.

The cup kicked off with the single-legged preliminary round which was played on 25 August 2010. Most of the top flight clubs entered the competition in the following round, played on 21 and 22 September 2010, with the exception of Karlovac and Lokomotiva, as their cup coefficient (determined by their cup record over the last five seasons) was too low to skip the preliminary round. In addition, RNK Split and Zadar, two of the top-level clubs, failed to qualify for the competition.

Calendar

Preliminary round
The draw for the preliminary round was held on 4 August 2010, and matches were held on 25 August and 1 September 2010. This round consisted of 16 single-legged fixtures.

* Match played on 1 September.

First round
First round proper consisted of 16 single-legged matches, with 16 winners of the preliminary round joined by 16 clubs with the highest cup coefficients (including 12 out of the remaining 14 top-level clubs, excluding RNK Split and NK Zadar, whose cup coefficients were too low to enter competition). The draw for the first round was held on 2 September, and matches were played on 21 and 22 September 2010.

* Match played on 21 September.

Second round
The second round will be contested by 16 winners from the first round and will be contested in 8 single-legged fixtures scheduled for 27 October 2010. It will be the last stage of the competition employing the single leg format as from the quarter-finals onwards all fixtures will be double-legged events.

* Match played on 26 October.

Quarter-finals
The eight clubs remaining in the competition after the second round were paired for the quarter-finals. From the quarter-finals onwards the ties will be played in a two-legged format. The draw was held on 28 October, first legs will be played on 10 November and second legs on 24 November 2010.

|}

Semi-finals

First legs

Second legs

Varaždin won 3–1 on aggregate

Dinamo Zagreb won 5–1 on aggregate

Final

First leg

Second leg

Dinamo Zagreb win 8–2 on aggregate.

See also
2010–11 Croatian First Football League
2010–11 Croatian Second Football League

References

External links
Official website 

Croatian Football Cup seasons
Croatia
Croatian Cup, 2010-11